Mirko Vuillermin (born 2 August 1973 in Aosta) is a retired Italian short track speed skater who competed in the 1992 Winter Olympics and in the 1994 Winter Olympics.

Career
At the 1992 Winter Olympics in Albertville, Vuillermin was a member of the Italian relay team that finished eighth in the 5000 metre relay.

On 27 March 1993, at the World Short Track Speed Skating Championships in Beijing, Vuillermin broke Mark Lackie's 500 m world record, recording a time of 43.08, with the gold medal in the 500 metres, which was Italy's first individual world championship gold medal in short track speed skating.

At the 1994 Winter Olympics in Lillehammer, Vuillermin won the gold medal in the 5000 metre relay along with Maurizio Carnino, Orazio Fagone and Hugo Herrnhof. He also claimed the silver medal in the 500 metres, and finished 21st In the 1000 metres.

On 29 March 1996 Vuillermin captured another 500 m world record, winning the 500-meter race in 42.68 seconds at the World Short Track Speed Skating Team Championships in Lake Placid.

In 1997, Vuillermin competed in newly established European Short Track Speed Skating Championships, where he won the 500 metres and 1500 metres, and took the runner-up spot behind Italian fellow Fabio Carta in the overall competition.

Retirement
Vuillermin's career suddenly ended on 20 June 1997. Just weeks after teammate Orazio Fagone had his right leg amputated in a motorcycle accident, Vuillermin nearly suffered the same fate. He crashed his motorcycle into a truck in Quart, Aosta Valley, suffering severe injuries. It took him a year and a half to recover, but he would never again ice skate competitively.

External links
 

Italian male short track speed skaters
Olympic short track speed skaters of Italy
Short track speed skaters at the 1992 Winter Olympics
Short track speed skaters at the 1994 Winter Olympics
Olympic gold medalists for Italy
Olympic silver medalists for Italy
People from Aosta
1973 births
Living people
Olympic medalists in short track speed skating
Medalists at the 1994 Winter Olympics
Sportspeople from Aosta Valley